The Serie B 1962–63 was the thirty-first tournament of this competition played in Italy since its creation.

Teams
Triestina, Cagliari and Foggia had been promoted from Serie C, while Padova, Lecco and Udinese had been relegated from Serie A.

Final classification

Results

References and sources
Almanacco Illustrato del Calcio - La Storia 1898-2004, Panini Edizioni, Modena, September 2005

Serie B seasons
2
Italy